The Imperial Legislative Council (ILC) was the legislature of the British Raj from 1861 to 1947. It was established under the Charter Act of 1853 by providing for the addition of 6 additional members to the Governor General Council for legislative purposes. Thus, the act separated the legislative and executive functions of the council and it was this body  within the GG council which came to known as the Indian/Central Legislative Council. In 1861 it was renamed as Imperial Legislative Council and the strength was increased.    

It succeeded the Council of the Governor-General of India, and was succeeded by the Constituent Assembly of India and after 1950, was succeeded by Parliament of India.  

During the rule of the East India Company, the council of the Governor-General of India had both executive and legislative responsibilities. The council had four members elected by the Court of Directors. The first three members were permitted to participate on all occasions, but the fourth member was only allowed to sit and vote when legislation was being debated. In 1858, the British Crown took over the administration from the East India Company. The council was transformed into the Imperial Legislative Council, and the Court of Directors of the Company, which had the power to elect members of the Governor-General's Council, ceased to have this power. Instead, the one member who had a vote only on legislative questions came to be appointed by the Sovereign, and the other three members by the Secretary of State for India.

Predecessors
The Regulating Act of 1773 limited the influence of the Governor-General of India and established the Council of Four, elected by the East India Company's Court of Directors. Pitt's India Act of 1784 reduced the membership to three, and also established the India Board.

1861 to 1892
The Indian Councils Act 1861 made several changes to the Council's composition. The council was now called the Governor-General's Legislative Council or the Imperial Legislative Council. Three members were to be appointed by the Secretary of State for India, and two by the Sovereign. (The power to appoint all five members passed to the Crown in 1869.) The viceroy was empowered to appoint an additional six to twelve members. The five individuals appointed by the Indian Secretary or Sovereign headed the executive departments, while those appointed by the Governor-General debated and voted on legislation.

Indians in the Council
There were 45 Indians nominated as additional non-official members from 1862 to 1892. Out of these 25 were zamindars and seven were rulers of princely states. The others were lawyers, magistrates, journalists and merchants. The participation of the Indian members in the council meetings was negligible.

 Raja Sir Deo Narayan Singh of Benaras (Jan 1862–1866)
 Narendra Singh, Maharaja of Patiala (Jan 1862–1864)
Dinkar Rao (Jan 1862–1864)
Yusef Ali Khan, Nawab of Rampur (Sep 1863–1864)
 Maharaja Sir Mirza Gajapati Viziaram, Raj Bahadur of Vizianagram (Jan 1864–1866)(Apr 1872–1876)
 Raja Sir Sahib Dayal of Kishen Kot (Jan 1864–1866)
 Mahtabchand Bahadur, Raja of Burdwan (Nov 1864–1866)
 Khwaja Abdul Ghani, Nawab of Dacca (Dec 1867–1869)
 Prasanna Coomar Tagore (Dec 1867–1873)
 Dheoraj Singh of Kashipur (Jan 1868–1870)
 Sawai Ram Singh II, Maharaja of Jaipur (Aug 1868–1870) and (Aug 1871–1875)
 Digvijay Singh, Raja of Balrampur (Oct 1868–1870)
 Ramanath Tagore (Feb 1873–1875)
Raja Shamsher Parkash of Sirmur
 Sir Ishwari Prasad Narayan Singh, Maharaja of Benaras (1876)
 Sir Narendra Krishna Deb (1876)
 Nawab Faiz Ali Khan, Nawab Bahadur of Pahasu (1877)
 Kalb Ali Khan, Nawab of Rampur (1878–1887)
 Syed Ahmad Khan (1878–1882)
 Jatindramohan Tagore (Bengal Zamindars) (1880–1881)
 Raghubir Singh of Jind (1880)
 Raja Shiva Prasad of Benaras
 Durga Charan Laha, Maharaja of Shyampukur (1882) (Calcutta Merchants)
 Kristo Das Pal (1883)
Syed Ameer Ali (1883– )
 Vishvanath Narayan Mandlik (1884–1887)
 Sir Shankar Bakhsh Singh (1886)
 Peary Mohan Mukherjea
 Dinshaw Maneckji Petit (1886)
 Khwaja Ahsanullah
 Sir Romesh Chandra Mitra, Bengal
 Krishnaji Lakshman Nulkar, Bombay (1890–1891)
 Rashbihari Ghosh (1892)

1892 to 1909
The Indian Councils Act 1892 increased the number of legislative members with a minimum of ten and maximum of sixteen members. The Council now had 6 officials, 5 nominated non-officials, 4 nominated by the provincial legislative councils of Bengal Presidency, Bombay Presidency, Madras Presidency and North-Western Provinces and 1 nominated by the chamber of commerce in Calcutta. The members were allowed to ask questions in the Council but not allowed to ask supplementaries or discuss the answer. They were however empowered to discuss the annual financial statement under certain restrictions but could not vote on it.

Indians in the Council
Pherozeshah Mehta, Bombay (1893–1896) (1898–1901)
Lakshmeshwar Singh, Bengal (1893–1898)
Baba Khem Singh Bedi, Punjab nominated (1893–1897), Punjab (1897–1905)
Fazulbhai Vishram, Bombay nominated (1893–)
Gangadhar Rao Chitnavis, Central Provinces nominated (1893–1909)
Mir Humayun Jah Bahadur (1893–)
Rashbihari Ghosh (1894–1908)
Babu Mohini Mohan Roy (1894)
P. Ananda Charlu, Madras (1895–1903)
Rahimtulla M. Sayani, Bombay (1896–1898)
Nawab Amiruddin Ahmad Khan of Loharu (1897)
Balwant Rao Bhuskute, Central Provinces (1896–1897)
Pandit Bishambar Nath (1897)
Joy Gobind Laha (1897)
Nawab Faiyaz Ali Khan, Nawab Bahadur of Pahasu, North-West Provinces (1898–1900)
Rameshwar Singh Bahadur, Bengal nominated (1899–1904), Bengal (1904–)
Apcar Alexander Apcar, Bengal Chamber of Commerce (1900–1903)
Syed Hussain Bilgrami (1902–1908)
Raja Surindar Bikram Prakash Bahadur of Sirmur (1902–1907)
Aga Khan III, nominated (1903)
Gopal Krishna Gokhale, Bombay (1903–1909)
Ernest Cable, Bengal Chamber of Commerce (1903–)
 Rai Sri Ram Bahadur, United Provinces (1903–)
Bipin Krishna Bose, Central Provinces (1903–)
  Wadero Ghulam Kadir M.B.E Nominated Ratodero Larrkanao(1913)
Nawab Syed Muhammad Bahadur, Madras (1903–1909)
Nawab Fateh Ali Khan Kazilbash, Punjab (1904)
R. G. Bhandarkar (1903)
Ripudaman Singh (1906–1908)
Nawab Khwaja Salimullah (1908)
Asutosh Mookerjee (1908)
Munshi Madho Lal, United Provinces (1907–1909)
Theodore Morison (1908)
Maing Ba Tow (1908)

1909 to 1920
The Indian Councils Act 1909 increased the number of members of the Legislative Council to 60, of whom 27 were to be elected. For the first time, Indians were admitted to membership, and there were six Muslim representatives, the first time that such representation had been given to a religious group.

The composition of the Council was as follows: 
 Ex-officio members from the Viceroy's Executive Council (9)
 Nominated officials (28)
 Nominated non-officials (5): Indian commercial community (1), Punjab Muslims (1), Punjab Landholders (1), Others (2)
 Elected from provincial legislatures (27)
 General (13): Bombay(2), Madras(2), Bengal(2), United Provinces(2), Central Provinces, Assam, Bihar & Orissa, Punjab, Burma
 Landholders (6): Bombay, Madras, Bengal, United Provinces, Central Provinces, Bihar & Orissa
 Muslim (6): Bengal (2), Madras, Bombay, United Provinces, Bihar & Orissa
 Commerce (2): Bengal Chamber of Commerce (1), Bombay Chamber of Commerce

Indians in the Council (1909–20)

Nominated Officials
Kiran Chandra De Mahesh

Nominated Non-Officials
 Surendranath Banerjee (1913–1920), Raja Piari Mohan Mukherjee (1915), Sir Fazalbhoy Currimbhoy Ebrahim (−1920), Ratanji Dadabhoy Tata (1920)

Bengal
 General: Sachchidananda Sinha (1910–12), Bhupendra Nath Bose (1911–19), Lalit Mohan Chatterjee, Rai Sita Nath Ray Bahadur (1916–19)
 Muslims: Syed Shamsul Huda (1911–15), A. K. Ghuznavi (1911), Maulvi Abdul Rahim (1916–1919), Nawab Bahadur Syed Nawab Ali Chowdhury (1916–20)
 Landholders: Bijoy Chand Mahtab (1909–12), Manindra Chandra Nandy (1916–19)

Bihar & Orissa
 General: Sachchidananda Sinha (1912–20), Madhusudan Das (1913), Rai Bahadur Krishna Sahay (1916–1919)
 Muslims: Mulana Mazharul Haque (1910–11), Syed Ali Imam (1912) Quamrul Huda (1915), Mohammad Yunus (1916)
 Landholders: Rajendra Narayan Bhanja Deo Raja of Kanika (1916–1920)

Bombay
General: Gopal Krishna Gokhale (1909–1915), Vithalbhai Patel (1912), Dinshaw Edulji Wacha (1916–1920), Lallubhai Samaldas Mehta, Pheroze Sethna, Sir Vithaldas Thackersey
 Muslim: Muhammad Ali Jinnah (1910–1911) and (1916–1919), Ghulam Muhammad Bhurgri (1911–1912), Ibrahim Rahimtoola (1913–1919), Sir Shah Nawaz Bhutto
 Landholders: Sir Sassoon David, 1st Baronet (1910), Wadero Ghulam Kadir Dayo 1913 1914, Khan Bahadur Saiyed Allahondo Shah (1916–1919)

Burma
 General: Maung Mye (1915), Maing Ba Tu (1911–1920)

Central Provinces
 General: Sir Maneckji Byramji Dadabhoy (1911–1917), Raghunath Narasinha Mudholkar (1911–1912), V. R. Pandit, General (1915), Ganesh Shrikrishna Khaparde (1918–1920), Rai Sahib Seth Nath Mal
Landholders: Sir Gangadhar Rao Chitnavis (1893–1916), Pandit Bishan Dutt Shukul (1916–1919)

East Bengal & Assam
 General: Kamini Kumar Chanda (1920) 
 Landholders: Pramathanath Roy, Raja of Dighapatia (1911–1915)

Madras
 General: N. Subba Rao Pantulu (1910–1913), C. Vijayaraghavachariar (1913–1916), V. S. Srinivasa Sastri (1916–1919), B. N. Sarma (1916–1919), Kurma Venkata Reddy Naidu (1920), T. Rangachari, M. Ct. Muthiah Chettiar
 Muslim: Ghulam Muhammad Ali Khan (1910–1913), Nawab Syed Muhammad Bahadur (1909–1919), Khan Bahadur Mir Asad Ali (1916–1919)
 Landholders: Veerabhadra Raju Bahadur (1912), Raja of Panagal (1912–1915), K. V. Rangaswamy Iyengar (1916–1919)

Punjab
 General: Raja Sir Daljit Singh (1913–1915), Sir Runbhir Singh (1915), Dewan Tek Chand (1915–1917), Sundar Singh Majithia (1917–1920)
 Muslims: Sir Zulfikar Ali Khan (1910–1920), Muhammad Shafi (1917)
 Landholders: Pratap Singh of Kapurthala (1910–1911), Col. Raja Jai Chand, Sir Malik Umar Hayat Khan (1911–1920)
 Chiefs : Sultan Karam Dad Khan of Pharwala (1918)

United Provinces
 General: Madan Mohan Malaviya (1911–1919), Bishan Narayan Dar (1914–1920), Tej Bahadur Sapru (1916–1919)
 Muslims: Sir Mohammad Ali Mohammad Khan Raja of Mahmudabad (1909–1912), Nawab Abdul Majid (1912), Nawab Mohammad Ismail Khan
 Landholders: Raja Sir Rampal Singh of Kurri Sudauli

1920 to 1947

Under the Government of India Act 1919, the Imperial Legislative Council was converted into a bicameral legislature with the Imperial Legislative Assembly (also known as the Central Legislative Assembly) as the lower house of a bicameral legislature and the Council of State as the upper house, reviewing legislation passed by the Assembly. The Governor-General nonetheless retained significant power over legislation. He could authorise the expenditure of money without the Legislature's consent for "ecclesiastical, political [and] defence" purposes, and for any purpose during "emergencies". He was permitted to veto, or even stop debate on, any bill. If he recommended the passage of a bill, but only one chamber co-operated, he could declare the bill passed over the objections of the other chamber. The Legislature had no authority over foreign affairs and defence. The President of the Council of State was appointed by the Governor-General; the Central Legislative Assembly elected its own President, apart from the first, but the election required the Governor-General's approval.

Under the Indian Independence Act 1947, the Imperial Legislative Council and its houses were dissolved on 14 August 1947 and was replaced by the Constituent Assembly of India and the Constituent Assembly of Pakistan.

See also
 Council of India
 Council of State (India)
 Viceroy's Executive Council
 Central Legislative Assembly
 Interim Government of India

References

External links
 History of Assembly (Old Secretariat) at Legislative Assembly of Delhi website

 
1861 establishments in British India